Tsukikage (月影 hiragana つきかげ）Japanese "moonlight") may refer to:

Fictional characters
Tsukikage Ninpō-chō Nijūichi no Me (Moonshadow Ninja Scroll: Twenty-One Eyes 1963 from List of ninja films
Ran Tsukikage, in Carried by the Wind: Tsukikage Ran (風まかせ月影蘭, Kazemakase Tsukikage Ran, lit. Wind-borne Moon-lit Ran) 2000 animated action comedy
Tsukikage, teacher in Japanese shōjo manga series Glass Mask  
Toshi Tsukikage, in Soar High! Isami
Koharu Tsukikage, in the video game Valkyrie Drive: Bhikkhuni
Tsukikage, in Kamen Rider Decade: All Riders vs. Dai-Shocker
Tsukikage, blind samurai in the video game Code of Princess
Yuri Tsukikage, voiced by Aya Hisakawa in anime HeartCatch PreCure!
Sayoko Tsukikage, in Kousoku Sentai Turboranger
Takeshi Tsukikage, commander in Space Warrior Baldios
Kazane Tsukikage, in Kensei: Sacred Fist
Tsukikage, in Release the Spyce

Music
Tsukikage (album), album by Japanese singer Shizuka Kudo 2005 
"Tsukikage no Napoli", song by W. from Koi no Vacance

Japanese-language surnames